Charles Mitford (31 May 1785 in England – 30 October 1831 at Brighton, Sussex) was an English cricketer who played first-class cricket in 1815.  Mainly associated with Middlesex, he made 2 known appearances in first-class matches.

References

External links
 CricketArchive profile

Sources

Further reading
 H S Altham, A History of Cricket, Volume 1 (to 1914), George Allen & Unwin, 1962
 Derek Birley, A Social History of English Cricket, Aurum, 1999
 Rowland Bowen, Cricket: A History of its Growth and Development, Eyre & Spottiswoode, 1970

1785 births
1831 deaths
English cricketers
English cricketers of 1787 to 1825
Marylebone Cricket Club cricketers
Epsom cricketers
William Ward's XI cricketers